Jia Yunbing (born 24 June 1981) is a Chinese former judoka who competed in the 2000 Summer Olympics.

References

1981 births
Living people
Chinese male judoka
Olympic judoka of China
Judoka at the 2000 Summer Olympics
Judoka at the 2002 Asian Games
Judoka at the 2006 Asian Games
Asian Games competitors for China
20th-century Chinese people
21st-century Chinese people